The Watkins 25, also known as the W25 and marketed as the Seawolf 25 from 1986, is an American trailerable sailboat that was designed by the Watkins Design Team and first built in 1983.

Development
The Watkins 25 design is believed to have been based upon the hull moulds for the Columbia 24, with a newly designed deck and coachhouse roof. The design was later sold to Com-Pac Yachts and was developed into the Com-Pac 25.

Production
The design was built by Watkins Yachts in Clearwater, Florida, United States. About 183 examples of the design were produced from 1983 to 1989, but it is now out of production.

Design
The Watkins 25 is a recreational keelboat, built predominantly of fiberglass, with wood trim. It has a masthead sloop rig, a raked stem, a vertical transom, an internally mounted spade-type rudder controlled by a tiller and a fixed fin keel. It displaces  and carries  of ballast.

The deep draft keel was developed at the request of a customer by cutting off the old keel mould and making a new one for a cast lead keel. Only a few were produced, probably between two and five.

Each boat was custom-built to the buyer's specifications, so the fleet varies in options and features. A bow-mounted anchor platform was optional. When mounted, a different pulpit was used and the forestay was shortened to accommodate the wooden platform, but retained the same attachment point and sail plan. Other options include a flushing head, pressurized water, a hot water tank and a reboarding ladder.

The design's hull is molded in a single piece using polyester resin and fiberglass woven roving, as well as multidirectional chopped strand fibers (MSCF). The keel is integral to the hull and the ballast is internal to the keel. The deck and the cockpit and also moulded in pone piece, also using polyester resin and fiberglass woven roving with MCSF. Plywood coring is employed for the cabin top, deck, seat and the cockpit sole for stiffness. The hull-to-deck joint is flanged, glued and then screwed into place. There is an aluminum toe rail, stainless steel through-bolted into place, bonding the toe rail, deck and the hull.

The spars are all coated 6061-T6 aluminum extrusions. There is a single reefing point. The mainsheet design involved two blocks, one on each side or the cabin top, although many have been modified to a mainsheet traveler.

An anchor well is located at the bow with a hawspipe leading the anchor chain into the "V" berth locker. The main cabin has  of headroom and is finished with hand-rubbed teak trim, with the bulkheads and cabinetry made from teak veneer on plywood. The main cabin sole is teak and holly veneer over plywood.

Ventilation on early boats was provided by two opening plastic framed ports with integral screens and on later boats built three aluminum framed ports, also  with integral screens. All boats also have an extruded aluminum framed Bomar forward deck hatch.

Operational history
The boat is supported by an active class club, the Watkins Owners.

In a 2010 review Steve Henkel wrote, "best features: At 5' 11" the boat has the best headroom among her comp[etitor]s. Her extruded and perforated aluminum toe rail is handy for easy placement of genoa blocks and fenders. Worst features: The very shallow (2' 6") keel is convenient but prevents good upwind performance; a deep-keel version was available toward the end of the boat’s production run but didn’t attract many buyers. The rudder depth looks a bit low to us, and therefore might give control problems under adverse weather conditions."

See also
List of sailing boat types

Similar sailboats
Bayfield 25
Bombardier 7.6
Cal 25
Cal 2-25
C&C 25
Capri 25
Catalina 25
Catalina 250
Dufour 1800
Freedom 25
Hunter 25.5
Jouët 760
Kelt 7.6
MacGregor 25
Merit 25
Mirage 25
Northern 25
O'Day 25
Sirius 26
Tanzer 25
US Yachts US 25

References

Keelboats
1980s sailboat type designs
Sailing yachts
Trailer sailers
Sailboat type designs by Watkins Design Team
Sailboat types built by Watkins Yachts